Love @ First Note is a 2006 Hong Kong teen romance film, written, produced and directed by Dennis Law, and starring Alex Fong, Justin Lo, and Kary Ng. Its title in the original Chinese release was 戀愛初歌.

Cast 

Kary Ng as Kristi
Justin Lo as Kei
Alex Fong as Tony
Stephy Tang as Amy
Theresa Fu as Philo
Miki Yeung
Tats Lau
Lam Suet
George Lam
Leo Ku

Plot 

Kristi (Kary Ng) is a girl who works at a used record store. She has a very good friend, Kei (Justin Lo). They have been friends since they were very young. One day, a young man, Tony (Alex Fong) comes into the store and Kristi develops a crush on him. She seeks help and advice from Kei.

Kei is a songwriter. He helps the lead singer of Silver Misquitoes write songs. One day, Kristi goes with Kei to the bar to deliver a song, and the lead singer Jack Ming starts to woo her. Kristi acted rudely in return, causing Jack to seek revenge for the embarrassment. Tony wishes to be a member of Silver Misquitoes so Jack uses Tony against Kristi. Tony asks Kristi on a date to a part with his "band". Jack pays two girls, Philo (Theresa Fu) and Amy (Stephy Tang), to lead Kristi into an evil plan, embarrassing her. Later, everyone, except Jack, who was involved with this plan realized their wrong and apologized to Kristi. Kristi, Tony, Kei, and Kristi's boss Lobo (Tats Lau) form their own band to beat Jack in a talent competition. During the competition, they realized Jack stole their song. Kei then takes out a song "Kong" (an original from Justin Lo's album No Protection) which he wrote for Kristi, his love. They win the competition and Kristi realizes she loves Kei, too.

External links
Love @ First Note Official Site
 IMDb entry
 loveHKfilm entry

2006 films
Hong Kong romantic drama films
2000s romance films
Films directed by Dennis Law
2000s Hong Kong films
Hong Kong musical films